François de Gantès (1596-1679) was a French aristocrat, landowner and military commander.

Biography

Early life
François de Gantès was born to an aristocratic family in 1596. His father, Jacques de Gantès (1567-1631), was Lord of Valbonnette.

Career
He inherited the Lordship of Valbonnette from his father.

He served as a military commander and adviser to King Louis XIV of France (1638-1715). He also served as a General Prosecutor in the Parliament of Aix-en-Provence from 1634 to 1674.

Personal life
In 1634, he married Jeanne de Croze de Lincel (unknown-1681). They had four children:
Jean-François de Gantès.
Michel de Gantès.
Françoise de Gantès.
Gabrielle de Gantès.

In 1660, he commissioned the construction of the Hôtel de Gantès, a hôtel particulier located at 53 bis on the Cours Mirabeau in Aix-en-Provence. It is now listed as a monument historique.

He died in 1679.

References

1596 births
1679 deaths
People from Aix-en-Provence
Provencal nobility
17th-century French lawyers
17th-century French military personnel